Stanley Gogwe (born 13 February 1989) is a Zimbabwean cricket umpire. He has stood in domestic matches in the 2016–17 Pro50 Championship and the 2017–18 Logan Cup.

References

External links
 

1989 births
Living people
Zimbabwean cricket umpires
Sportspeople from Harare